Alex Massie may refer to:

 Alex Massie (footballer) (1906–1977), Scottish footballer
 Alex Massie (journalist) (born 1974), Scottish journalist and commentator
 Alex Massie (snowboarder) (born 1995), Canadian para-snowboarder